Cosmosoma fenestrata is a moth of the family Erebidae. It was described by Dru Drury in 1773. It is found on Jamaica and Cuba.

Description
Upperside: Antennae nearly black and pectinated (comb like). Head and eyes black. Palpi small and long, and of a fine scarlet. Tongue spiral. Thorax blueish green, almost black. Abdomen dark brown. Anterior wings the same, the middle part being perfectly transparent like glass, wherein is a dark cloud which is joined to the anterior margin. Posterior wings small, transparent, with a dark brown narrow border running round their edges, which at the upper corners is broad where it becomes cloud like.

Underside: Breast dark brown. Legs and thighs scarlet, which colour extends along the middle of the abdomen, almost to the tail, where it becomes a little fainter, being crossed by the rings of the abdomen, which are black and very narrow. All the wings of the same colour as on the upperside.

References

fenestrata
Moths described in 1773
Descriptions from Illustrations of Exotic Entomology
Taxa named by Dru Drury